The 2008 Mackay Cutters season was the first in the club's history. Captain-coached by Shane Muspratt, they competed in the QRL's Wizard Cup. The club finished ninth in their inaugural season, winning seven games, losing 12 and drawing once.

Season summary 
The Cutters played their first Queensland Cup game local rivals, the Northern Pride, who were also playing their first game, losing 16–44. Proserpine junior Sam Faust, who was contracted to the North Queensland Cowboys at the time, scored the club's first try. Two more losses followed before the club recorded their first win, a 24–22 victory over the Redcliffe Dolphins at Dolphin Oval. Their first home win came three weeks later when they defeated the Souths Logan Magpies 22–12 at the Mackay Junior Rugby League grounds. They won just four of their last 13 games and finished the season in ninth place.

Milestones 
 Round 1: The club played their first Queensland Cup game.
 Round 1: Sam Faust scored the club's first try.
 Round 6: The club recorded their first Queensland Cup win.
 Round 8: The club recorded back-to-back wins for the first time.
 Round 21: Quinton Fielder became the first Cutters' player to score 3 tries in a game.
 Round 22: The club recorded their first three-game winning streak.

Squad List

2008 squad 

The following players contracted to the North Queensland Cowboys played for the Cutters in 2008: Daniel Abraham, Daniel Backo, Travis Burns, Ben Farrar, Sione Faumuina, Sam Faust, John Frith, George Gatis, Keiron Lander, Anthony Perkins, Matthew Scott, Shane Tronc, Anthony Watts and Dayne Weston.

Squad movement

Gains 

The Cutters recruited a number of players from the local Mackay & District Rugby League competition, they included: Aaron Barba, Sam Granville, David Nixon, Matt Parnis (Mackay Brothers), Dean Tass (Northern Suburbs Devils), Daniel Flynn, Scott Leigh, Royston Lightning, Jared Owens (Sarina Crocs), Anthony Caulton, Michael Comerford, Michael Pearce, Todd Seymour, Luke Srama, Kerrod Toby (Souths Sharks), James Bryant and Chris Giumelli (Wests Tigers).

Losses

Fixtures

Regular season

Statistics

Honours

Club 
 Player of the Year: Kerrod Toby
 Players' Player: Daniel Flynn
 Most Improved: Dean Tass
 Club Person of the Year: Kay Peel

References 

2008 in Australian rugby league
2008 in rugby league by club
Mackay Cutters